Tony Popovic (born 4 July 1973) is an Australian association football manager and former player. He is the current manager of A-League club Melbourne Victory.

As a player Popovic's usual position was centre-back. Starting in 1989 at Sydney United he went on to play for Sanfrecce Hiroshima of Japan and Premier League side Crystal Palace, among other clubs. He appeared with the Australian national team at the 2006 FIFA World Cup, where he played against reigning World Champions Brazil.

Popovic started his coaching career in 2008 with Sydney FC. After a brief stint as assistant manager at Crystal Palace he was chosen as the inaugural manager of Western Sydney Wanderers at the start of the 2012–13 season. His major achievements as a manager are winning the 2012–13 A-League Premiership and 2014 AFC Champions League with the Wanderers, the 2018–19 A-League Premiership with Perth Glory and an Australia Cup with Melbourne Victory in 2022.

He is the father of Kristian and Gabriel Popovic, both of whom are also professional footballers.

Club career

Early career
Popovic was born in Sydney to a Croatian family,
and grew up in Fairfield, New South Wales. He began his career with Sydney United with a one-year stint in his junior career at Fairfield Bulls. He rose through the youth ranks, making 162 appearances in seven years for the first team, before moving to play in the J1 League. Popovic signed with Sanfrecce Hiroshima where he stayed for five years scoring 13 goals in 94 appearances.

Crystal Palace
Popovic signed for Crystal Palace on a free transfer in August 2001 from Sanfrecce Hiroshima. He became an integral part of the Palace defence, eventually becoming club captain. He played more than 120 matches for Crystal Palace. In his last season he played for Crystal Palace in 21 Premier League matches. In total he made more than 120 appearances for the club.

Popovic's contract with Palace expired at the end of June 2006, and he decided against accepting the club's offer of a new contract. He instead moved to Qatar club, Al-Arabi.

Sydney FC
In 2007, with the growth of the A-League and slight homesickness, Popovic moved to Sydney FC, signing a two-year deal, with coach Branko Culina also announcing him the club's captain. Popovic scored his first goal on 28 October 2007 from a corner to beat the Mariners 3–2 in front of his home crowd of 17,850.

Popovic announced his retirement on 11 November 2008 after nearly 20 years as a professional footballer.

International career
Popovic competed at the 1992 Summer Olympics in Barcelona for the Australia U23 team. He began his full international career in 1995 with the Australia national team. Over the next eleven years Popovic made 58 appearances for the Socceroos, scoring 8 goals.

The highlight of Popovic's career came in 2006 when the Australian national team qualified for the 2006 FIFA World Cup under the management of Guus Hiddink. He took part in both legs in the qualifying match against Uruguay. Being replaced in the first half of the second leg, due to injury, by Harry Kewell. The tall defender was named in the competing squad and made his World Cup debut against Brazil on 18 June. He suffered a calf injury 40 minutes into the game and was replaced by Mark Bresciano for the second half. His injury ruled him out of Australia's last match in the group stage, against Croatia, and their second round loss against eventual winners, Italy.

On 4 October 2006, Popovic announced his retirement from the Socceroos.

His final game was a friendly against Paraguay that month. He scored his eighth international goal, from a Mark Bresciano free kick, in his final minute on field to put Australia ahead, 1–0 in a game that finished 1–1.

Coaching career

After retiring, Popovic moved into an assistant coach's role with Sydney FC, where he remained until February 2011, when he returned to England and to Crystal Palace as first team coach, after former teammate Dougie Freedman was appointed manager.

Western Sydney Wanderers
On 17 May 2012, Popovic was announced as inaugural manager of A-League club Western Sydney Wanderers. He joined the club on a four seasons deal after requesting to be released from the final year of his contracted role as assistant manager of Crystal Palace. In Wanderers' first season, Popovic was named A-League Coach of the Year after finishing first in the league. In the 2013–14 season Popovic led Wanderers to the 2014 AFC Champions League Final in the club's first attempt in the competition. They defeated Al-Hilal in the final, becoming the first Australian team to win the tournament. As a result of this achievement, Popovic was named as the 2014 AFC Coach of the Year. With poor recruiting, the loss of assistant coach Ante Milicic, and a gruelling schedule of matches, the 2014–15 season saw Popovic's team finish ninth in the league and eliminated from the group stage of the 2015 AFC Champions League. Despite an unfavorable season Popovic signed a new three-season deal with Western Sydney Wanderers, which would keep him at the club helm until 2018.

Karabükspor
On 1 October 2017, Popovic made a shock announcement that he had resigned from Western Sydney Wanderers to coach Turkish Süper Lig club Karabükspor. It came less than a week out from the start of the 2017–18 A-League season. After nine games, on 15 December 2017, he was sacked by the club and was owed AUD$1.4M compensation. The club's entire boardroom quit during his time at the club and after he left, the club went into financial administration and continue to be relegated every season.

Perth Glory
On 11 May 2018, Popovic was confirmed as Perth Glory's new manager following the dismissal of Kenny Lowe at the end of the 2017–18 season. His first game in charge was a pre-season friendly against Chelsea which the Glory lost 0–1. Under Popovic's management, Perth won the 2018–19 A-League premiership.

Xanthi FC
On 26 August 2020, shortly after coaching Perth to a 2–0 loss to Sydney FC in the A-League semi finals, Popovic activated a contractual clause allowing him to leave the club for a European team, after signing with Greek Super League side Xanthi FC, that was bought by Greek-Australian business tycoon Bill Papas. He lasted five months, being sacked with the club in 5th place and four points from the top. Goalkeeping coach Zeljko Kalac stated later that Popovic was sabotaged and fired due to the owners wanting more control over decisions. Papas would later be accused by Australian banking authorities over an alleged loan fraud scheme that cost multiple banks over $500 million AUD in total.

Melbourne Victory
On 21 April 2021, Melbourne Victory appointed Popovic head coach on a three year contract to replace Grant Brebner and Steve Kean, who coached the team to last place in the previous season. Popovic had early success, bringing the club back to the top of the A-League table after eight games and winning the 2021 FFA Cup on 5 February 2022.

Career statistics

Club

International

Scores and results list Australia's goal tally first, score column indicates score after each Popovic goal.

Managerial statistics

Honours

Player
Australia
 OFC Nations Cup: 1996, 2000, 2004

ManagerWestern Sydney Wanderers A-League Men: Premiers 2012–13; runner-up 2013–14, 2015–16
 A-League Men Finals runner-up: 2013, 2014, 2016
 AFC Champions League: 2014Perth Glory A-League Men: Premiers 2018–19
 A-League Men Finals runner-up: 2019Melbourne Victory'''
 A-League Men runner-up: 2021–22
 Australia Cup: 2021

Individual
 A-League Men Coach of the Year: 2012–13, 2018–19, 2021–22
 PFA A-League Manager of the Season: 2012–13, 2018–19
 AFC Coach of the Year: 2014

References

External links

 Player profile – Tony Popovic Sydney FC
 Australian Player Database Oz Football

1973 births
Living people
Sydney United 58 FC players
Sanfrecce Hiroshima players
Crystal Palace F.C. players
Sydney FC players
Premier League players
Al-Arabi SC (Qatar) players
A-League Men players
J1 League players
National Soccer League (Australia) players
Crystal Palace F.C. non-playing staff
A-League Men managers
Western Sydney Wanderers FC managers
Kardemir Karabükspor managers
Qatar Stars League players
Australian people of Croatian descent
Australia international soccer players
Olympic soccer players of Australia
Australian expatriate soccer players
Australian expatriate soccer coaches
Expatriate footballers in Japan
Expatriate footballers in England
Expatriate sportspeople in Qatar
Australian expatriate sportspeople in Japan
Australian expatriate sportspeople in England
Australian expatriate sportspeople in Qatar
Soccer players from Sydney
Association football defenders
Australian soccer coaches
Australian soccer players
Footballers at the 1992 Summer Olympics
1996 OFC Nations Cup players
2000 OFC Nations Cup players
2001 FIFA Confederations Cup players
2005 FIFA Confederations Cup players
2006 FIFA World Cup players